An Yiru (born 20 June 1984) is the pen name for a modern-day freelance writer Zhang Li.  Her works often revolve around love stories.  She has been accused of plagiarism.

Works
《人生若只如初见》
《当时只道是寻常》 　　
《思无邪》 　　
《陌上花开缓缓归》（ 再版后书名改为《陌上花开》）
《惜春纪》
《美人何处》
《世有桃花》
《要定你，言承旭》
《看张·爱玲画语》

References 

People from Xuancheng
Writers from Anhui
Chinese women novelists
People's Republic of China novelists
Living people
1984 births